HMS Trusty was an  destroyer that served with the Royal Navy. The vessel was the third of the name. Launched in November 1918 just before the Armistice that ended the First World War, Trusty joined the Home Fleet the following year. However, the destroyer did remain in service long and was transferred to the Reserve Fleet in 1920. The vessel remained in reserve until 25 September 1936, although in a deteriorating condition. On that day, Trusty was sold to be broken up as part of a deal for the liner Majestic.

Design and development

Trusty was one of thirty-three Admiralty  destroyers ordered by the British Admiralty in June 1917 as part of the Twelfth War Construction Programme. Differences with the R class were minor, such as having the searchlight moved aft.

Two funnels were fitted.

Armament consisted of three QF  Mk IV guns on the ship's centreline.  One was mounted raised on the forecastle, one between the funnels and one aft. The ship also mounted a single  2-pounder pom-pom anti-aircraft gun for air defence. Four  tubes were fitted in two twin rotating mounts aft. The ship was designed to mount two additional  torpedo tubes either side of the superstructure but this required the forecastle plating to be cut away, making the vessel very wet, so they were soon removed. The weight saved enabled the heavier Mark V 21-inch torpedo to be carried. The ship had a complement of 90 officers and ratings.

Construction and career
Trusty was laid down by J. Samuel White at East Cowes on the Isle of Wight with the yard number 1514 on 11 April 1918, and launched on 6 November the same year, just five days before the Armistice which ended the First World War. The ship was the third to enter Royal Navy service with the name. On completion on 9 May the following year, Trusty was allocated to the Fourth Destroyer Flotilla of the Home Fleet. The ship did not remain long in service, however, and was commissioned into the Reserve Fleet at Portsmouth on 24 August 1920. Like many of the class stored in reserve, the ship deteriorated and by the middle of the next decade was considered by the Admiralty to be in too poor condition to return to operations. Trusty was therefore chosen as one of twenty-two destroyers which were given to Thos. W. Ward of Sheffield in exchange for the liner Majestic. The ship was sold on 25 September 1936 and subsequently broken up at Inverkeithing.

Pennant numbers

References

Citations

Bibliography

 
 
 
 
 
 
 
 
 

1918 ships
S-class destroyers (1917) of the Royal Navy
Ships built on the Isle of Wight